The European Society of Catholic Theology is an association of European Catholic theologians whose goal is to promote the academic discipline of Catholic theology primarily at the intersection where Church and society meet. Founded in 1989, its members work at theological institutes, universities, academies and seminaries. It publishes a bi-annual journal which explores issues facing contemporary theological debate in Europe.

References

External links
European Society for Catholic Theology

Catholic theology and doctrine
Higher education organisations based in Europe